A serial film, film serial (or just serial), movie serial, or chapter play, is a motion picture form popular during the first half of the 20th century, consisting of a series of short subjects exhibited in consecutive order at one theater, generally advancing weekly, until the series is completed.  Usually, each serial involves a single set of characters, protagonistic and antagonistic, involved in a single story, which has been edited into chapters after the fashion of serial fiction and the episodes cannot be shown out of order or as a single or a random collection of short subjects.

Each chapter was screened at a movie theater for one week, and ended with a cliffhanger, in which characters found themselves in perilous situations with little apparent chance of escape. Viewers had to return each week to see the cliffhangers resolved and to follow the continuing story. Movie serials were especially popular with children, and for many youths in the first half of the 20th century a typical Saturday matinee at the movies included at least one chapter of a serial, along with animated cartoons, newsreels, and two feature films.

There were films covering many genres, including crime fiction, espionage, comic book or comic strip characters, science fiction, and jungle adventures. Many serials were Westerns, since those were the least expensive to film. Although most serials were filmed economically, some were made at significant expense. The Flash Gordon serial and its sequels, for instance, were major productions in their times. Serials were action-packed stories that usually involved a hero (or heroes) battling an evil villain and rescuing a damsel in distress. The villain would continually place the hero into inescapable deathtraps, or the heroine would be placed into a deathtrap and the hero would come to her rescue. The hero and heroine would face one trap after another, battling countless thugs and lackeys, before finally defeating the villain.

History
 List of film serials by year

Silent era
Notable American serials of the silent era include The Perils of Pauline and The Exploits of Elaine made by Pathé Frères and starring Pearl White. Another popular serial was the 119-episode The Hazards of Helen made by Kalem Studios and starring Helen Holmes for the first forty-eight episodes then Helen Gibson for the remainder. Ruth Roland, Marin Sais, and Ann Little were also early leading serial queens. Other major studios of the silent era, such as Vitagraph and Essanay Studios, produced serials, as did Warner Bros., Fox, and Universal. Several independent companies (for example, Mascot Pictures) made Western serials. Four silent Tarzan serials were also made.

Serials were a popular form of movie entertainment dating back to Edison's What Happened to Mary of 1912. There appear to be older serials, however, such as the 1910 Deutsche Vitaskop 5 episode Arsene Lupin Contra Sherlock Holmes, based upon the Maurice LeBlanc novel, and a possible but unconfirmed Raffles serial in 1911.

Europe had its own serials: in France Victorin-Hippolyte Jasset launched his series of Nick Carter films in 1908, and the idea of the episodic crime adventure was developed particularly by Louis Feuillade in Fantômas (1913–14), Les Vampires (1915), and Judex (1916); in Germany,  Homunculus (1916), directed by Otto Rippert, was a six-part horror serial about an artificial creature.

Years after their first release, serials gained new life at "Saturday Matinees", theatrical showings on Saturday mornings aimed directly at children.

Sound era
The arrival of sound technology made it costlier to produce serials, so that they were no longer as profitable on a flat rental basis. Further, the Great Depression made it impossible for many of the smaller companies that produced serials to upgrade to sound, and they went out of business. Only one serial specialty company, Mascot Pictures, transitioned from silent to sound filmmaking. Universal Pictures also kept its serial unit alive through the transition.

In the early 1930s a handful of independent companies tried their hand at making serials, including the once-prolific Weiss Brothers. The Weisses bought a little time when Columbia Pictures decided to take a try at serials, and contracted with them (as Adventure Serials Inc.) to make three chapterplays. They were successful enough that Columbia then established its own serial unit and the Weisses essentially disappeared from the serial scene. This was in 1937, and Columbia was probably inspired by the previous year's serial blockbuster success at Universal, Flash Gordon, the first serial ever to play at a major theater on Broadway; and by the success of that same year of the newly created Republic Pictures, which dedicated itself to a program of serials and westerns, eschewing major productions in their favor. The creation of Republic involved the absorption of Mascot Pictures, so that by 1937, serial production was now in the hands of three companies only – Universal, Columbia, and Republic, with Republic quickly becoming the acknowledged leader in quality serial product. Each company turned out four to five serials per year, of 12 to 15 episodes each, a pace they all kept up until the end of World War II when, in 1946, Universal dropped its serial unit along with its B-picture unit and renamed its production department Universal-International Pictures. Republic and Columbia continued unchallenged, with about four serials per year each, Republic fixing theirs at 12 chapters each while Columbia fixed at fifteen.

By the mid-1950s, however, episodic television series and the sale of older serials to TV syndicators by all the current and past major sound serial producers, together with the loss of audience attendance at Saturday matinees in general, made serial-making a losing proposition.

Production

Peak form
The classic sound serial, particularly in its Republic format, has a first episode of about 30 minutes (approximately three reels in length) and begins with reports of a masked, secret, or unsuspected villain menacing an unspecific part of America. This episode traditionally has the most detailed credits at the beginning, often with pictures of the actors with their names and that of the character they play. Often there follows a montage of scenes lifted from the cliffhangers of previous serials to depict the ways in which the master criminal was a serial killer with a motive. In the first episode, various suspects or "candidates" who may, in secret, be this villain are presented, and the viewer often hears the voice but does not see the face of this mastermind commanding his "lead villain", similar to a sergeant, whom the viewer sees in just about every episode.

In the succeeding weeks (usually 11 to 14) thereafter, an episode nearly 20 minutes (approximately two reels) in length was presented, in which the "lead villain" and lesser thugs commit crimes in various places, fight the hero, and trap someone to make the ending a cliffhanger. Many of the episodes have clues, dialogue, and events leading the viewer to think that any of the candidates were the mastermind. As serials were made by writing the whole script first and then slicing it into portions filmed at various sites, often the same location would be used several times in the serial, often given different signage, or none at all, just being referred to differently. There would often be a female love interest of the male hero, or a female hero herself, but as the audience was mainly children, there was no hugging and kissing.

The beginning of each chapter would bring the story up to date by repeating the last few minutes of the previous chapter, and then revealing how the main character escaped. Often the reprised scene would add an element not seen in the previous close, but unless it contradicted something shown previously, audiences accepted the explanation. On rare occasions the filmmakers would depend on the audience not remembering details of the previous week's chapter, using alternate outcomes that did not exactly match the previous episode's cliffhanger.

The last episode was sometimes a bit longer than most, for its tasks were to unmask the head villain (who usually was someone completely unsuspected), wrap up the loose ends, and end with a triumphal proclamation, followed by a joke – and sometimes a kiss (provided that the story supplied a heroine to receive it).
In 1938, Republic introduced the "economy episode" (or "recap chapter") in which the characters summarize or reminisce about their adventures, so as to introduce showing those scenes again (in the manner of a clip show in modern television). This type of episode usually had a cheap, mechanical cliffhanger, like a time bomb rather than being unconscious in a runaway vehicle.

Production practices

The major studios had their own retinues of actors and writers, their own prop departments, existing sets, stock footage, and music libraries. The early independent studios had none of these, but could rent sets from independent producers of western features.

The firms saved money by reusing the same cliffhangers, stunt and special-effects sequences over the years. Mines or tunnels flooded often, even in Flash Gordon, and the same model cars and trains went off the same cliffs and bridges. Republic had a Packard limousine and a Ford Woodie station wagon used in serial after serial so they could match the shots with the stock footage from the model or previous stunt driving. Three different serials had them chasing the Art Deco sound truck, required for location shooting, for various reasons. Male fistfighters all wore hats so that the change from actor to stunt double would not be caught so easily. A rubber liner on the hatband of the stuntman's fedora would make a seal on the stuntman's head, so the hat would stay on during fight scenes.

Exposition of what led up to the previous episode's cliffhanger was usually displayed on placards with a photograph of one of the characters on it. In 1938, Universal brought the first "scrolling text" exposition to the serial, which George Lucas first used in Star Wars in 1977 and then in all of the following Star Wars films. As this would have required subcontracting the optical effects, Republic saved money by not using it.

Stylistic differences between the studios

Universal had been making serials since the 1910s, and continued to service its loyal neighborhood-theater customers with four serials annually. The studio made news in 1929 by hiring Tim McCoy to star in its first all-talking serial, The Indians Are Coming! Epic footage from this western serial turned up again and again in later serials and features. In 1936 Universal scored a coup by licensing the popular comic-strip character Flash Gordon for the screen; the serial was a smash hit, and was even booked into first-run theaters that usually did not bother with chapter plays. Universal followed it up with more pop-culture icons: The Green Hornet and Ace Drummond from radio, and Smilin' Jack and Buck Rogers from newspapers. Universal was more story-conscious than the other studios, and cast its serials with "name" actors recognizable from feature films: Lon Chaney, Jr., Béla Lugosi, Dick Foran, The Dead End Kids, Kent Taylor, Robert Armstrong, Irene Hervey, and Johnny Mack Brown, among many others. In the 1940s Universal's serials employed urban and/or wartime themes, incorporating newsreel footage of actual disasters. The 1942 serial Gang Busters is perhaps the best of Universal's urban serials; Universal often cannibalized it for future cliffhangers. Don Winslow of the Navy may exemplify Universal's best war-themed chapterplay. The studio's reliance on stock footage for the big action scenes was certainly economical, but it often hurt the overall quality of the films. When the studio reorganized as Universal-International, it shut down most of the production units, including the serial crew. Universal's last serial was The Mysterious Mr. M (1946).

Republic was the successor to Mascot Pictures, a serial specialist. Writers and directors were already geared to staging exciting films, and Republic improved on Mascot, adding music to underscore the action, and staging more elaborate stunts. Republic was one of Hollywood's smaller studios, but its serials have been hailed as some of the best, especially those directed by John English and William Witney. In addition to solid screenwriting that many critics thought was quite accomplished, the firm also introduced choreographed fistfights, which often included the stuntmen (usually the ones portraying the villains, never the heroes) throwing things in desperation at one another in every fight to heighten the action. Republic serials are noted for outstanding special effects, such as large-scale explosions and demolitions, and the more fantastic visuals like Captain Marvel and Rocketman flying. Most of the trick scenes were engineered by Howard and Theodore Lydecker. Republic was able to get the rights to the newspaper comic character Dick Tracy, the radio character The Lone Ranger, and the comic book characters Captain America, Captain Marvel, and Spy Smasher. Republic's serial scripts were written by teams, usually from three to seven writers. From 1950 Republic economized on serial production. The studio was no longer licensing expensive radio and comic-strip characters, and no longer staging spectacular action sequences. To save money, Republic turned instead to its impressive backlog of action highlights, which were cleverly re-edited into the new serials. Most of the studio's serials of the 1950s were written by only one man, Ronald Davidson—Davidson had co-written and produced many Republic serials, and was familiar enough with the film library to write new scenes based on the older action footage. Republic's last serial was King of the Carnival (1955), a reworking of 1939's Daredevils of the Red Circle using some of its footage.

Columbia made several serials using its own staff and facilities (1938–1939 and 1943–1945), and these are among the studio's best efforts: The Spider's Web, The Great Adventures of Wild Bill Hickok, Batman, The Secret Code, and The Phantom maintained Columbia's own high standard. However, Columbia's serials often have a reputation for cheapness, because the studio usually subcontracted its serial production to outside producers: the Weiss Brothers (1937–1938), Larry Darmour (1939–1942), and finally Sam Katzman (1945–1956). Columbia built many serials around name-brand heroes. From newspaper comics, they got Terry and the Pirates, Mandrake the Magician, The Phantom, and Brenda Starr, Reporter; from the comic books, Blackhawk, Congo Bill, time traveler Brick Bradford, and Batman and Superman (although this last owed more to its radio incarnation, which the credits acknowledged); from radio, Jack Armstrong and Hop Harrigan; from the hero pulp characters like The Spider (two serials: The Spider's Web and The Spider Returns) and The Shadow (despite also being a very popular radio series); from the British novelist Edgar Wallace, the first archer-superhero, The Green Archer; and even from television: Captain Video. Columbia's early serials were very well received by audiences—exhibitors voted The Spider's Web (1938) the number-one serial of the year. Former silent-serial director James W. Horne co-directed The Spider's Web, and his work secured him a permanent position in Columbia's serial unit. Horne had been a comedy specialist in the 1930s, often working with Laurel and Hardy, and most of his Columbia serials after 1939 are played tongue-in-cheek, with exaggerated villainy and improbable heroics (the hero takes on six men in a fistfight and wins). After Horne's death in 1942, the studio's serial output was somewhat more sober, but still aimed primarily at the juvenile audience. Batman (1943) was quite popular, and Superman (1948) was phenomenally successful. Spencer Gordon Bennet, another silent-serial veteran, directed most of the later Columbia serials. His western-themed efforts were suitably accomplished, but Columbia cut corners in every respect until the quality of the serials suffered. Columbia also used cartoon animation instead of more expensive special effects with its science-fiction serials. By the 1950s Columbia serials were very-low-budget affairs, consisting mostly of action scenes and cliffhanger endings from older productions, and even employing the same actors for new scenes tying the old footage together. The new footage was so threadbare that it would often show the new hero watching the action from a distance, rather than actually participating in it. Columbia outlasted the other serial producers, its last being Blazing the Overland Trail (1956).

Availability
Film serials released to the home video market from original masters include the majority of Republic titles (with a few exceptions, such as Ghost of Zorro)—which were released by Republic Pictures Home Video on VHS and sometimes laserdisc (sometimes under their re-release titles) mostly from transfers made from the original negatives, The Shadow, and Blackhawk, both released by Sony only on VHS, and DVD versions of Flash Gordon, Flash Gordon's Trip to Mars, and Flash Gordon Conquers the Universe (Hearst), Adventures of Captain Marvel (Republic Pictures), Batman and Batman and Robin (Sony), Superman and Atom Man vs. Superman (Warner), and The Green Hornet (VCI). Notable restorations of partially lost or forgotten serials such as The Adventures of Tarzan, Beatrice Fairfax, The Lone Ranger Rides Again, Daredevils of the West and King of the Mounties have been developed and made available to fans by The Serial Squadron. A gray market for DVDs also exists consisting of DVD companies releasing titles from privately owned 16mm prints or even copies of previously released VHS or laserdisc editions, and various websites and internet auctions. These DVDs vary between good and poor quality, depending on their source. In 2017, Adventures of Captain Marvel became the first serial to be released on Blu-ray.

The Universal serials were sold outright to TV distributor Serials Inc. in July 1956. When Serials Inc. closed in 1970, the company now known as VCI Entertainment obtained the rights. VCI is offering new Blu-Ray and DVD restorations of many Universal serials, including Gang Busters, Jungle Queen, Pirate Treasure, and three Buck Jones adventures. All of the new VCI releases derive from Universal's 35mm vault elements.

Post-1950s serials
There have been several post-1950s attempts at reviving or recalling cliffhanger serials, by both fans and professional studios, and serials were often spoofed in cartoons of the 1960s.

In the early days of television in the United States, movie serials were often broadcast, one chapter a day, and in the late 1970s and 1980s, they were often revived on BBC television in the United Kingdom. Many have been released in home video formats. The popular Indiana Jones movies are a well-known, romantic pastiche of the serials' plot elements and devices.

Amateur/fan efforts 

An early attempt at a low-budget Western serial, filmed in color, was entitled The Silver Avenger. One or two chapters exist of this effort on 16mm film but it is not known whether the serial was ever completed.

The best-known fan-made chapter play is the four-chapter, silent 16mm Captain Celluloid vs. the Film Pirates, made to resemble Republic and Columbia serials of the 1940s and completed in 1966. The plot involved a masked villain named The Master Duper, one of three members of a Film Commission who attempts to steal the only known prints of priceless antique films, and the heroic Captain Celluloid, who wears a costume reminiscent of that of the Black Commando in the Columbia serial The Secret Code and is determined to uncover him. Roles in the serial are played by, among others, film historians and serial fans Alan G. Barbour, Al Kilgore, and William K. Everson.

In the 1970s, serial fan Blackie Seymour shot a complete 15-chapter serial called The Return of the Copperhead. Seymour's only daughter, who operated the camera at the age of 8, attests that as of 2008 the serial was indeed filmed but the raw footage remains in cans, unedited.

In 2001, King of the Park Rangers, a one-chapter sound serial was released by Cliffhanger Productions on VHS video tape in sepia. It concerned the adventures of a Park Ranger named Patricia King and an FBI Agent who track down a trio of killers out to find buried treasure in the New Jersey Pine Barrens.

A second ten-chapter serial, The Dangers of Deborah, in which a female reporter and a criminologist fight to uncover the identity of a mysterious villain named The Terror, was released by Cliffhanger Productions in 2008.

In 2006, Lamb4 Productions created its own homage to the film serials of the 1940s with its own serial titled "Wildcat."  The story revolves around a super hero named Wildcat and his attempts to save the fictional Rite City from a masked villain known as the Roach.  This eight-chapter serial was based heavily on popular super hero serials such as "Batman and Robin," "Captain America," and "The Adventures of Captain Marvel." After its premiere, "Wildcat" was posted on the official Lamb4 Productions YouTube channel for public viewing.

Studio/commercial efforts, cartoons, and spoofery 

The serial format was used with stories on the original run of The Mickey Mouse Club (1955–58), with each chapter running about six to ten minutes.  The longer-running dramatic serials included "Corky and White Shadow", "The Adventures of Spin and Marty", "The Hardy Boys: The Mystery of the Applegate Treasure", "The Boys of the Western Sea", "The Secret of Mystery Lake", "The Hardy Boys: The Mystery of Ghost Farm", and The Adventures of Clint and Mac.

Other Disney programs shown on Walt Disney Presents in segments (such as The Scarecrow of Romney Marsh, The Swamp Fox, The Secret of Boyne Castle, The Mooncussers, and The Prince and the Pauper) and Disney feature films (including Treasure Island; The Three Lives of Thomasina; The Story of Robin Hood and His Merrie Men; Rob Roy, the Highland Rogue; and The Fighting Prince of Donegal) edited into segments for television presentation often had a cliffhanger-serial-like feel. 

In England, in the 1950s and 60s, low-budget six-chapter serials such as Dusty Bates and Masters of Venus were released theatrically, but these were not particularly well-regarded or remembered.

The greatest number of serialized television programs to feature any single character were those made featuring "the Doctor", the BBC character introduced in 1963. Doctor Who serials would run anywhere from one to twelve episodes and were shown in weekly segments, as had been the original theatrical cliffhangers. Doctor Who was syndicated in the US as early as 1974, but did not gain a following in America until the mid-1980s when episodes featuring Tom Baker reached its shores. Although the series ended in 1989, it was revived in 2005, now following a more standard episode format.

The 1960s cartoon show Adventures of Rocky and Bullwinkle included two serial-style episodes per program. These spoofed the cliffhanger serial form. Within the Rocky and Bullwinke show, the recurring but non-serialized Dudley Do-Right, specifically parodied the damsel in distress (Nell Fenwick) being tied to railroad tracks by arch villain Snidely Whiplash and rescued by the noble but clueless Dudley. The Hanna–Barbera Perils of Penelope Pitstop was a takeoff on the silent serials The Perils of Pauline and The Iron Claw, which featured Paul Lynde as the voice of the villain Sylvester Sneakley, alias "The Hooded Claw".

Danger Island, a multi-part story in under-10-minute episodes, was shown on the Saturday morning Banana Splits program in the late 1960s. Episodes were short, full of wild action and usually ended on a cliffhanger. This serial was directed by Richard Donner and featured the first African American action hero in a chapter play. The violence present in most of the episodes, though much of it was deliberately comical and would not be considered shocking today, also raised concerns at a time when violence in children's TV was at issue.

On February 27, 1979, NBC broadcast the first episode of an hour-long weekly television series Cliffhangers!, which had three segments, each with a different serial: a horror story (The Curse of Dracula, starring Michael Nouri), a science fiction/western (The Secret Empire, (inspired by 1935's The Phantom Empire) starring Geoffrey Scott as Marshal Jim Donner and Mark Lenard as Emperor Thorval) and a mystery (Stop Susan Williams!, starring Susan Anton, Ray Walston as Bob Richards, and Albert Paulsen as the villain Anthony Korf). Though final episodes were shot, the series was canceled and the last program aired on May 1, 1979 before all of the serials could conclude; only The Curse of Dracula was resolved.

In 2006, Dark Horse Indie films, through Image Entertainment, released a 6-chapter serial parody called Monarch of the Moon, detailing the adventures of a hero named the Yellow Jacket, who could control Yellow Jackets with his voice, battled "Japbots", and traveled to the moon. The end credits promised a second serial, Commie Commandos From Mars. Dark Horse attempted to promote the release as a just-found, never-before-released serial made in 1946, but suppressed by the US Government.

Public domain
Several serials are now in the public domain. These can often be downloaded legally over the internet or purchased as budget-priced DVDs. The list of public domain serials includes:

The Vanishing Legion with Harry Carey (1931)
The Hurricane Express with John Wayne (1933)
Burn 'Em Up Barnes with Frankie Darro (1934)
The Lost City with Kane Richmond (1935)
The New Adventures of Tarzan with Herman Brix (1935)
The Phantom Empire with Gene Autry (1935)
Undersea Kingdom with Ray Corrigan (1936) 
Ace Drummond with John 'Dusty' King (1936)
Dick Tracy with Ralph Byrd (1937)
Zorro's Fighting Legion with Reed Hadley (1939)
The Phantom Creeps with Bela Lugosi (1939)
Flash Gordon Conquers the Universe with Buster Crabbe (1940)
The Green Archer with Victor Jory (1940)
Holt of the Secret Service with Jack Holt (1941)
Gang Busters with Kent Taylor (1942)
Captain America with Dick Purcell (1944)
The Great Alaskan Mystery with Milburn Stone (1944)
Zorro's Black Whip with Linda Stirling (1944)
Radar Men from the Moon with Roy Barcroft (1952, originally conceived as a TV series)

Selected film serials
 List of film serials by year
 List of film serials by studio

Selected serials of the Silent Era
 What Happened to Mary? (1912)
 The Adventures of Kathlyn (1913)
 Fantômas (1913) – (Cinema of France)
 The Perils of Pauline (1914)
 The Hazards of Helen (1917)
 The Exploits of Elaine (1914)
 Les Vampires (1915) – (Cinema of France)
 The Ventures of Marguerite (1915)
 Les Mystères de New York (1916)
 Le Masque aux Dents Blanches (1917)
 Judex (1917)
 Casey of the Coast Guard (1926)
 Tarzan the Mighty (1928)
 Queen of the Northwoods (1929) (Last serial from Pathé)
 Tarzan the Tiger (1929) (partial sound)

Serials of the golden age of serials
The "golden age" of serials is generally from 1936 to 1945.

 Ace Drummond (Universal, 1936)
 Custer's Last Stand (Weiss Bros., 1936)
 Darkest Africa (Republic, 1936)
 Flash Gordon (Universal, 1936)
 Robinson Crusoe of Clipper Island (Republic, 1936)
 Shadow of Chinatown (Victory, 1936)
 The Adventures of Frank Merriwell (Universal, 1936)
 The Clutching Hand (Weiss Bros., 1936)
 The Black Coin (Weiss Bros., 1936)
 The Phantom Rider (Universal, 1936)
 The Vigilantes Are Coming (Republic, 1936)
 Undersea Kingdom (Republic, 1936)
 Blake of Scotland Yard (Victory, 1937)
 Dick Tracy (Republic, 1937)
 Jungle Jim (Universal, 1937)
 Jungle Menace (Weiss Bros./Columbia, 1937)
 Radio Patrol (Universal, 1937)
 S.O.S. Coast Guard (Victory. 1937)
 Secret Agent X-9 (Universal, 1937)
 The Mysterious Pilot (Weiss Bros./Columbia, 1937)
 The Painted Stallion (Republic, 1937)
 Tim Tyler's Luck (Universal, 1937)
 Wild West Days (Universal, 1937)
 Zorro Rides Again (Republic, 1937)
 Dick Tracy Returns (Republic, 1938)
 Flaming Frontiers (Universal, 1938)
 Flash Gordon's Trip to Mars (Universal, 1938)
 Hawk of the Wilderness (Republic, 1938)
 Red Barry (Universal, 1938)
 The Fighting Devil Dogs (Republic, 1938)
 The Secret of Treasure Island (Weiss Bros./Columbia, 1938)
 The Great Adventures of Wild Bill Hickok (Columbia, 1938)
 The Lone Ranger (Republic, 1938)
 The Spider's Web (Columbia, 1938)
 Buck Rogers (Universal, 1939)
 Daredevils of the Red Circle (Republic, 1939)
 Dick Tracy's G-Men (Republic, 1939)
 Flying G-Men (Columbia, 1939)
 Mandrake the Magician (Columbia, 1939)
 Overland with Kit Carson (Columbia, 1939)
 Scouts to the Rescue (Universal, 1939)
 The Lone Ranger Rides Again (Republic, 1939)
 The Oregon Trail (Universal, 1939)
 The Phantom Creeps (Universal, 1939)
 Zorro's Fighting Legion (Republic, 1939)
 Adventures of Red Ryder (Republic, 1940)
 Deadwood Dick (Columbia, 1940)
 Drums of Fu Manchu (Republic, 1940)
 Flash Gordon Conquers the Universe (Universal, 1940)
 Junior G-Men (Universal, 1940)
 King of the Royal Mounted (Republic, 1940)
 Mysterious Doctor Satan (Republic, 1940)
 Terry and the Pirates (Columbia, 1940)
 The Green Archer (Columbia, 1940)
 The Green Hornet (Universal, 1940)
 The Green Hornet Strikes Again (Universal, 1940)
 The Shadow (Columbia, 1940)
 Winners of the West (Universal, 1940)
 Adventures of Captain Marvel (Republic, 1941)
 Dick Tracy vs. Crime, Inc. (Republic, 1941)
 Holt of the Secret Service (Columbia, 1941)
 Jungle Girl (Republic, 1941)
 King of the Texas Rangers (Republic, 1941)
 Riders of Death Valley (Universal, 1941)
 Sea Raiders (Universal, 1941)
 Sky Raiders (Universal, 1941)
 The Iron Claw (Columbia, 1941)
 The Spider Returns (Columbia, 1941)
 White Eagle (Columbia, 1941)
 Captain Midnight (Columbia, 1942)
 Don Winslow of the Navy (Universal, 1942)
 Gang Busters (Universal, 1942)
 Junior G-Men of the Air (Universal, 1942)
 King of the Mounties (Republic, 1942)
 Overland Mail (Universal, 1942)
 Perils of Nyoka (Republic, 1942)
 Perils of the Royal Mounted (Columbia, 1942)
 Spy Smasher (Republic, 1942)
 The Secret Code (Columbia, 1942)
 The Valley of Vanishing Men (Columbia, 1942)
 Adventures of the Flying Cadets (Universal, 1943)
 Batman (Columbia, 1943)
 Daredevils of the West (Republic, 1943)
 Don Winslow of the Coast Guard (Universal, 1943)
 G-Men vs. the Black Dragon (Republic, 1943)
 Secret Service in Darkest Africa (Republic, 1943)
 The Adventures of Smilin' Jack (Universal, 1943)
 The Masked Marvel (Republic, 1943)
 The Phantom (Columbia, 1943)
 Black Arrow (Columbia, 1944)
 Captain America (Republic, 1944)
 Haunted Harbor (Republic, 1944)
 Raiders of Ghost City (Universal, 1944)
 The Desert Hawk (Columbia, 1944)
 The Great Alaskan Mystery (Universal, 1944)
 Mystery of the River Boat (Universal, 1944)
 The Tiger Woman (Republic, 1944)
 Zorro's Black Whip (Republic, 1944)
 Brenda Starr, Reporter (Columbia, 1945)
 Federal Operator 99 (Republic, 1945)
 Jungle Queen (Universal, 1945)
 Jungle Raiders (Columbia, 1945)
 Manhunt of Mystery Island (Republic, 1945)
 Secret Agent X-9 (Universal, 1945)
 The Master Key (Universal, 1945)
 The Monster and the Ape (Columbia, 1945)
 The Purple Monster Strikes (Republic, 1945)
 The Royal Mounted Rides Again (Universal, 1945)

Other notable serials
 The King of the Kongo (1929) – First serial with sound (a Mascot production)
 The Mysterious Mr. M (1946) – Last serial from Universal
 Superman (1948) - First live-action appearance of Superman on film
 King of the Carnival (1955) – Last serial from Republic
 Blazing the Overland Trail (1956) – Last American serial (a Columbia production)
 Super Giant (1957) – Japanese tokusatsu superhero film serial (a Shintoho production), released in the U.S. as Starman

See also

 List of film serials by year
 List of film serials by studio
Pulp magazines, a contemporary, and similar, form of serialized fiction.
 The Star Wars and Indiana Jones film series; creator George Lucas says that both series were based on and influenced by serial films.
 List of fictional shared universes in film and television
 Marvel Cinematic Universe
 Serial (radio and television)

References

Further reading
 Robert K. Klepper, Silent Films, 1877–1996, A Critical Guide to 646 Movies, McFarland & Company, 
 Lahue, Kalton C. Bound and Gagged: The Story of the Silent Serials. New York: Castle Books 1968.
 Lahue, Kalton C. Continued Next Week : A History of the Moving Picture Serial. Norman. University of Oklahoma Press. 1969

External links
Serial Squadron
Silent Era, Index of Silent Era Serials
In The Balcony
Dieselpunk Industries
Mickey Mouse Club serials
TV Cream

History of film